Rafael Joey Q. Jazul Jr. (born April 11, 1986) is a Filipino professional basketball player for the Phoenix Pulse Fuel Masters of the Philippine Basketball Association (PBA). He was drafted 11th overall in the 2010 PBA draft by the Aces. He was then immediately sent to the Elasto Painters in exchange for Rain or Shine's 2nd round pick in the 2011 PBA Draft. He is also a member of the Letran Knights team who won the NCAA title in 2005

He was awarded the Mr. Quality Minutes award for the 2020 PBA season.

PBA career statistics

As of the end of 2021 season

Season-by-season averages

|-
| align=left | 
| align=left | Rain or Shine
| 35 || 13.3 || .292 || .312 || .692 || 1.3 || 1.1 || .3 || .0 || 3.6
|-
| align=left | 
| align=left | Shopinas.com / Air21
| 32 || 23.4 || .368 || .373 || .742 || 2.8 || 2.5 || .6 || .0 || 8.2
|-
| align=left | 
| align=left | Alaska
| 54 || 18.1 || .333 || .347 || .722 || 2.0 || 1.7 || .5 || .0 || 5.6
|-
| align=left | 
| align=left | Alaska
| 44 || 19.4 || .325 || .272 || .778 || 2.3 || 1.7 || .6 || .0 || 6.8
|-
| align=left | 
| align=left | Alaska
| 58 || 19.5 || .356 || .354 || .797 || 2.6 || 1.4 || .2 || .0 || 6.2
|-
| align=left | 
| align=left | Alaska
| 60 || 24.9 || .366 || .381 || .821 || 2.7 || 2.7 || .9 || .0 || 10.0
|-
| align=left rowspan=2| 
| align=left | Alaska
| rowspan=2|36 || rowspan=2|29.6 || rowspan=2|.328 || rowspan=2|.312 || rowspan=2|.846 || rowspan=2|3.4 || rowspan=2|3.6 || rowspan=2|1.1 || rowspan=2|.0 || rowspan=2|9.6
|-
| align=left | Phoenix
|-
| align=left | 
| align=left | Phoenix
| 36 || 24.6 || .306 || .294 || .750 || 2.6 || 2.5 || .9 || .0 || 7.9
|-
| align=left | 
| align=left | Phoenix
| 39 || 25.4 || .390 || .340 || .814 || 3.1 || 2.7 || 1.0 || .0 || 9.6
|-
| align=left | 
| align=left | Phoenix
| 17 || 25.4 || .360 || .339 || .824 || 2.3 || 2.1 || .7 || .0 || 11.0
|-
| align=left | 
| align=left | Phoenix
| 25 || 26.4 || .341 || .337 || .761 || 2.9 || 2.2 || .8 || .0 || 9.6
|-class=sortbottom
| align=center colspan=2 | Career
| 436 || 22.3 || .346 || .336 || .789 || 2.5 || 2.2 || .7 || .0 || 7.8

References

1986 births
Living people
Air21 Express players
Alaska Aces (PBA) players
Basketball players from Metro Manila
Filipino men's basketball players
Letran Knights basketball players
People from Pasay
Point guards
Rain or Shine Elasto Painters players
Phoenix Super LPG Fuel Masters players
Alaska Aces (PBA) draft picks